Nihat Emre Numanbayraktaroğlu (born 9 January 1977 in İzmit), is a Turkish former footballer. Currently assistant coach for Giresunspor in Turkey.

Youth career
1997 Kocaelispor

Professional career
1997–1999 Kocaelispor
1999–2000 Yozgat Yimpaş Spor
2000–2001 Kocaelispor
2001–2002 Marmaris Bld. Gençlikspor
2002–2004 Darıca Gençlerbirliği
2004–2006 Gölcükspor

Coaching career 
2008–2009 Kocaelispor  S.Gençler League Trainer
2009–2012 Kocaelispor  U18 Coach
2012–2013 Kocaelispor  U14 Coach
2013–2014 Kocaelispor  Professional Team Coach
2014-2014 Umm-Salal SC (Asst. coach)
2015-2016 Giresunspor  (Asst.Coach )

References 

Living people
1977 births
Turkish footballers
Association footballers not categorized by position